Jung Jin-young may refer to:
 Jung Jin-young (actor) (born 1964), South Korean actor
 Jung Jin-young (singer) (born 1991), South Korean musician